Panzar is a massively multiplayer online game feat multiplayer online battle arena developed and published by Russian Panzar Studio for Microsoft Windows. It is a free-to-play game, supported by micro-transactions.

It has 15 PvP arenas where teams face off in 5 different game modes including domination, king of the hill and ball capture. Teams are composed of characters from 8 different classes, all with their own unique abilities and skills.

References

External links
Official website
Official Russian website

2013 video games
Action video games
Fantasy video games
Free-to-play video games
Massively multiplayer online games
Video games developed in Russia
Windows games
Windows-only games